The Hot Spot is a 1990 American neo-noir film directed by Dennis Hopper, based on the 1953 novel Hell Hath No Fury by Charles Williams, who also co-wrote the screenplay. It stars Don Johnson, Virginia Madsen, and Jennifer Connelly, and features a score by Jack Nitzsche played by John Lee Hooker, Miles Davis, Taj Mahal, Roy Rogers, Tim Drummond, and drummer Earl Palmer.

Plot
Drifter Harry Madox takes a job as a used car salesman in a small Texas town. In the summer heat, he develops an interest in Gloria Harper, who works at the car dealership.  Dolly Harshaw, who is married to the dealership's owner, flirts with Harry and they begin a torrid affair.

Harry learns that the bank staff are all volunteer firemen so he sets a fire to lure them away from the bank. While they are gone, Harry robs the bank, and then enters the burning building to save a man trapped inside. Despite this the town's sheriff suspects Harry of committing the robbery, but Dolly gives him an alibi and tells him she will sell him out unless he kills her husband. When he refuses, Dolly threatens to expose him. She ultimately kills her husband herself by overstimulating his weak heart during sex.

Meanwhile, Gloria is being blackmailed by Frank Sutton, who has nude photographs of Irene Davey and Gloria, after hearing about Irene being with another woman, her former teacher. Harry, who has fallen in love with Gloria, confronts Sutton to get the pictures. They have a fight but Sutton continues to blackmail Gloria. Harry visits Sutton and finds him with a woman, and kills Sutton in the ensuing struggle. Harry plants evidence to divert suspicion away from himself, then tells the police that Sutton, who had no job and few assets, had recently paid cash for a new car, making it seem that Sutton had robbed the bank. Harry receives a hefty reward for providing the tip that helps the police "solve" the robbery. He plans to marry Gloria and take her to the Caribbean Islands.

Dolly ruins Harry's plans by showing him a copy of a letter (to be opened in the event of her death) implicating him in the robbery and in Sutton's death, and telling Gloria about the affair. A heartbroken Gloria leaves Harry. Enraged, Harry tries to strangle Dolly, but cannot bring himself to kill her. Harry resigns himself to life with Dolly, and leaves town with her.

Cast

Production
Charles Williams wrote a screenplay version of his own novel with Nona Tyson in 1962. It was intended for Robert Mitchum. Many years later, Dennis Hopper found the script and updated it. The director described the film as "Last Tango in Texas. Real hot, steamy stuff".

A bedroom scene originally called for Madsen to appear naked, but she decided to put on a negligee because she felt that, "Not only was the nudity weak storywise, but it didn't let the audience undress her". Hopper later admitted that Madsen was right.

Dennis Hopper gave his impressions of working with Johnson:

He wasn't that bad. He has a lot of people with him. He came on to this film with two bodyguards, a cook, a trainer, ah let's see, a helicopter pilot he comes to and from the set in a helicopter, very glamorous let's see, two drivers, a secretary, and, oh yes, his own hair person, his own make-up person, his own wardrobe person. So when he walks to the set he has five people with him.

Johnson found Hopper's approach to filmmaking "a little disappointing, I gotta tell you".  He later recalled:

Mike Figgis had written a script called The Hot Spot, and it was a heist movie. Three days before we started shooting, Dennis Hopper came to all of us, he called a meeting on a Sunday, and he said, "Okay, we're not making that script. We're making this one." And he passed a script around the table that had been written for Robert Mitchum in the '60s... or maybe it was the '50s... and it was based on a book called Hell Hath No Fury. And that was the movie that we ended up making. This was three days before we started shooting! So he was kind of looking around the table at everybody and saying, "Well, you know, if Don Johnson bails, we don't have a movie." [Laughs.] And I read the script, and I said, "Wow!" I mean, the Figgis script was really slick and cool, and it was a heist movie, but this was real noir, the guy was an amoral drifter, and it was all about how women were going to take him down.

Hopper shot the film on location in Texas during what he described as the "hottest, steamiest weather you could imagine". The primary locations were in Taylor, Texas, especially its iconic downtown area, locations around and in Austin as well as in Luling. The swimming scenes were filmed at the Hamilton Pool Preserve west of Austin. In part of the skinny-dipping scene, Madsen was body doubled by Heather Cruikshank, who was working in a strip club when she was cast.

Reception
The Hot Spot had its world premiere at the 1990 Toronto International Film Festival. Director Dennis Hopper felt that stars Don Johnson and Virginia Madsen were not as enthusiastic in promoting the film as he would have liked. Hopper said of Johnson that "He says he's not going to do anything for this picture until he reads the reviews." Johnson claims that he was unable to do promotion because he was shooting the film Harley Davidson and the Marlboro Man with Mickey Rourke. Of Madsen, Hopper claimed that she "was very embarrassed" by the amount of her on-screen nudity. The film was released on October 12, 1990, in 23 theaters, grossing US$112,188 in its opening weekend. The film grossed only $1.2 million in the North American market, far less than the cost of its production.

The Hot Spot received generally positive reviews from critics. Rotten Tomatoes gives it a 70% rating at based on reviews from 27 critics. Roger Ebert gave the film three out of four stars and wrote, "Only movie lovers who have marinated their imaginations in the great B movies from RKO and Republic will recognize The Hot Spot as a superior work in an old tradition." In her review for The New York Times, Janet Maslin wrote, "Mr. Hopper's direction is tough and stylish, in effective contrast with the sunny look of Ueli Steiger's cinematography." USA Today gave the film two-and-a-half stars out of four and wrote, "In other words, Hopper's direction isn't any great shakes, and the wrap-up is somewhat confusing, but this film does make you want to go skinny-dipping with someone else's mate." In his review for The Washington Post, Desson Howe wrote, "Hot Spot will never go down as timeless, neoclassic noir. But, with its Hopperlike moments, over-the-top performances and infectious music, it carries you along for a spell." Entertainment Weekly gave the film a "B" rating and Owen Gleiberman wrote, "Hopper still hasn't learned how to pace a movie, but working from Charles Williams' 1952 novel Hell Hath No Fury he comes up with a reasonably diverting hothouse yarn."

Home media
In 1990, the movie premiered exclusively on Showtime.

On August 13, 2013, Shout! Factory released The Hot Spot on Blu-ray as part of a double feature along with Killing Me Softly. Kino Lorber re-released the film on Blu-ray on May 4, 2021 in a new 2k master, containing new interviews with Virginia Madsen and William Sadler, and an audio commentary from entertainment journalist Bryan Reesman.

Soundtrack
The soundtrack for the film is composed by Jack Nitzsche and features an original collaboration between John Lee Hooker, Miles Davis, Taj Mahal, Tim Drummond, Earl Palmer, and Roy Rogers. Allmusic describes the soundtrack album as "marvelous music ... something listeners should be thankful for, particularly fans of either Miles Davis or John Lee Hooker".

References

External links
 
 
 
 
 

1990 crime drama films
1990 romantic drama films
1990s English-language films
American crime drama films
American neo-noir films
American romantic drama films
Films based on American novels
Films directed by Dennis Hopper
Films scored by Jack Nitzsche
Films set in Texas
Films shot in Texas
Orion Pictures films
Romantic crime films
1990s American films